This discography focuses solely on that of American vocal group the Drifters as managed by the Treadwell family.

Albums

Singles

Billboard Year-End performances

References

External links
 

Discographies of American artists
Rhythm and blues discographies
Pop music group discographies
Discography